This is a list of the scientific names of extant snakes. It includes 517 genera and 3,738 species:

References 

Scientific
Snakes,scientific